"The Fun Machine Took a Shit & Died" is a song by Queens of the Stone Age, intended for the band's 2005 album, Lullabies to Paralyze. In 2005, a rough studio version of the song was handed out to those who had tickets to the cancelled London shows. In 2007, the song was given away for free with the release of the band's 2007 album Era Vulgaris to those who pre-ordered it.

History 
The song was originally intended to be on the band's fourth studio album, Lullabies to Paralyze. The tapes were assumed stolen but were, in fact, misplaced. In an interview with Rolling Stone, singer Josh Homme said "The tapes got lost. Actually, they were just at another studio, but we falsely accused everyone in the world of theft."

A rough studio version of the song was placed on a series of 7" vinyl records, handed out to those who had tickets to the cancelled London shows.

The song was also performed by the band on their first live DVD, Over the Years and Through the Woods.

A new extended studio version of the song was recorded for a CD single released with pre-ordered copies of Era Vulgaris at Insound.com and Newbury Comics, with it also appearing as a bonus track on the German, Brazilian and Japanese editions of the album.

Track listing

2005 7" single

2007 CD single

References

Queens of the Stone Age songs
Songs written by Josh Homme
2005 singles
2005 songs
Interscope Records singles